McInnes Cooper is a full-service Canadian law firm with nearly 200 lawyers. It is centrally located in Atlantic Canada, with offices in Nova Scotia, New Brunswick, Prince Edward Island, and Newfoundland and Labrador.

As a multi-service firm, McInnes Cooper provides legal advice to a broad range of clients, including corporations, government agencies, regulatory institutions, and non-profit bodies. The firm's international capabilities are extended by its charter membership in Lex Mundi, the world's largest non-exclusive referral network of independent law firms with member firms in 160 jurisdictions.

History
McInnes Cooper was founded in 1859 by Jonathan McCully, Hector McInnes, Gordon Cooper, and Donald MacInnes.

In 1992, the firm worked on the privatization of Nova Scotia Power, which at the time was the largest private equity transaction in Canadian history. In 2013 the firm began a formal working relationship with the Canadian Civil Liberties Association to advance civil liberties in Atlantic Canada. In 2014, law firm Ottenheimer Baker joined McInnes Cooper in St. John's, making the combined law firm the largest in Newfoundland and Labrador.

Areas of practice 
The firm has a diverse range of practice areas:

 Aboriginal Law
 Agribusiness
 Banking and Financial Services
 Bankruptcy and Insolvency
 Business Disputes
 Class Actions
 Construction Law
 Corporate and Business
 Corporate Finance and Securities
 Corporate Governance and Compliance
 Cross-Border Law
 Education Law
Environmental Law
 Entertainment
 Estates and Trusts
 Foreign Direct Investment
 Franchise Law
 Health Law
 Immigration
 Insurance
 Intellectual Property
 Labour and Employment
 Litigation
 Maritime
 Mergers and Acquisitions
 Municipal Law
 Pensions and Benefits
 Privacy
 Public Law
 Real Estate
 Tax
 Technology

Notable lawyers and alumni
 Fred Dickson, QCFormer Senator for Halifax (2009-2012).
 Danny Graham, Special AdvisorMLA for Halifax Citadel, former leader of the Liberal Party of Nova Scotia.
 Donald MacInnes, Co-founderFormer Senator for Burlington (1881-1900), Former President of the Bank of Hamilton.
 Jonathan McCully, Co-founderConsidered a Founding Father of Canada, Former Puisne Justice of the Nova Scotia Supreme Court from 1870 to 1877.
Hector McInnes, Co-founderFormer Advisor to Prime Ministers Sir Robert Laird Borden and Arthur Meighen, MLA for Halifax County (1916-1920).
 Stewart McInnes, PC, QCFormer Member of Parliament of the House of Commons of Canada (1984-1998).
 Frank McKenna, PC, ON, ONB, QCDeputy Chairman of the Toronto-Dominion Bank, 27th Premier of New Brunswick, Former Canadian Ambassador to the United States.
 Jim ThistleFormer Vice President of the Liberal Party of Newfoundland and Labrador.
 Nick WhalenMember of Parliament of the House of Commons of Canada (2015–Present).

References

External links 

 

Law firms of Canada
1859 establishments in Canada
Law firms established in 1859